Segun Gele (born Hakeem Oluwasegun Olaleye; 2 May 1974) is a Nigerian born make-up artist and entrepreneur based in United States. His work was featured on CNN for his ability to tie the gele in flamboyant style, a fashion attire of significant importance to the Yoruba, Nigerian and West African women's fashion culture.

Personal life 
Oluwasegun was born on 2 May 1974 in the Western part of Nigeria. He grew up in Lagos and moved to Houston in 2003. In 2013, he married his wife, Olufunmilola, and they have three childrenn.

Education and career 
He is an alum of the St. Gregory's College, Lagos. Gele graduated from Lagos State University in 2001, with a degree in English. His career as a fashion personality and makeup artist started in Houston. Gele revealed that he learnt to tie the gele from his mother while growing up. His career kickstarted when, at a party in Houston, he bet $7 with a woman to impress her by tying her gele beautifully. He won the bet and subsequently went on to make $265 that day from tying other women's headgear. He made a business out of this and is paid to tie gele and do makeovers at events.

Film 
In 2017, Gele took part in the movie American Driver.

References 

Nigerian make-up artists
1974 births
St Gregory's College, Lagos alumni
Living people
Nigerian expatriates in the United States